The Aviation and Railway Accident Investigation Board (ARAIB) is an agency of the South Korean government that investigates aviation and railway accidents, subservient to the Ministry of Land, Infrastructure and Transport (MOLIT) and headquartered in Sejong City.

The ARAIB opened on July 10, 2006. It was a merger of the Korea Aviation Accident Investigation Board and the Railway Accident Investigation Board.

Facilities
Its FDR/CVR Analysis and Wreckage Laboratory is on the property of Gimpo International Airport in Gwahae-dong, Gangseo-gu, Seoul.

Previously the headquarters of the ARAIB was in Gonghang-dong, Gangseo-gu, in proximity to Gimpo Airport.

Accidents investigated by the ARAIB
 Asiana Airlines Flight 991

Also the ARAIB has a support role in the following investigations:
 Asiana Airlines Flight 214

See also

 Korean Maritime Safety Tribunal (maritime accident investigation agency)
 Korea Office of Civil Aviation (South Korean civil aviation agency)
 The Korea Transport Institute (South Korean transport research institute)

References

External links
 Aviation and Railway Accident Investigation Board
  Aviation and Railway Accident Investigation Board

Organizations investigating aviation accidents and incidents
Government agencies of South Korea
2006 establishments in South Korea
Transport organizations based in South Korea
Rail accident investigators
Government agencies established in 2006